Malvern Collegiate Institute (Malvern CI, MCI or Malvern), previously known as East Toronto High School and Malvern High School is a high school located in Toronto, Ontario, Canada part of the Toronto District School Board. Prior to 1998, it was part of the Toronto Board of Education.

The school was founded in 1903 and since then, Malvern has rooted in a long-standing history of academic and extra-curricular excellence with a close connection to the Beach community. The motto is Victrix Sapientia Fortunae (“Wisdom conquers fortune”).

History
Malvern C.I. was founded in 1903 as "East Toronto High School" in the mainly working class village of East Toronto.  It opened in the original Mary Street School building on Mary St. (now Kimberley P.S. and Kimberley Ave.) when the elementary school moved into a new building on the same site. The Toronto Board of Education bought a new property on Malvern Avenue (then known as Charles Street) in 1905 and opened a new building of four rooms in 1906. In 1908 East Toronto was annexed to Toronto, and the name "Charles Street" was changed to Malvern Avenue; in 1910 the Board renamed the school Malvern Avenue High School.  In 1914, it became Malvern Avenue Collegiate and subsequently Malvern Collegiate Institute.

The statue that stands on the west side of the school on Malvern Avenue, just outside the library, was built in 1922 in honour of the students that had attended Malvern C.I. and died in World War I. In November 2011, a ceremony rededicating the statue was held, a week before Remembrance Day to commemorate the repairs done to the arm. Less than 48 hours later, the statue was vandalized. It now has added security.

Like other Ontario schools, Malvern had a 13th grade from 1921 to 1988; grade 13 was replaced by the Ontario Academic Credit for students starting high school in 1984. OAC continued to act as a fifth year of secondary education until it was phased out in 2003.

Malvern celebrated its centennial in 2003 and Malvern at 110 in 2013.

In 2006, Toronto Life magazine stated that Malvern CI had the best English program in Toronto, a notable change from the 1980s, when the same magazine rated Malvern's English department as being in the bottom five of all Toronto collegiates.

The school's mascot is the Black Knight, and the school colours are double red and black. Its school song is Onward Malvern.

Its Concert and Marching band is renowned, and has played in many Santa Claus Parades, the official opening of the Toronto City Hall, for the Blue Jays, and the Grey Cup, to name a few,  and garnered several awards over the years.  Since 1960, the Malvern band has stood out for their uniform of red jackets with black and red kilts.

Malvern won the 2009 Anne Hope Award for its contributions in promoting human rights and equity education.

Notable alumni
Jack Kent Cooke
Wray Downes
Nathaniel Erskine-Smith
Robert Fulford
Glenn Gould
Israel Halperin
Norman Jewison
Bruce Kidd
Ailsa Land
Lois Marshall
Doris McCarthy
Stacie Mistysyn
Teresa Stratas
Stanley Thompson
Down with Webster
Jack McBain
Gage Munroe
Herbie Kuhn

See also
List of high schools in Ontario

References

External links
Official website
TDSB info
The Malvern Red & Black Society - alumni association for Malvern CI

High schools in Toronto
Schools in the TDSB
Educational institutions established in 1903
1903 establishments in Ontario